The Wedgwood scale (°W) is an obsolete temperature scale, which was used to measure temperatures above the boiling point of mercury of . The scale and associated measurement technique were proposed by the English potter Josiah Wedgwood in the 18th century. The measurement was based on the shrinking of clay when heated above red heat, and the shrinking was evaluated by comparing heated and unheated clay cylinders. Both the origin and the step were later found inaccurate.

History
The boiling point of mercury limits the mercury-in-glass thermometer to temperatures below 356 °C, which is too low for many industrial applications such as pottery, glass making and metallurgy. To solve this problem, the English potter Josiah Wedgwood proposed, in the 18th century, a method to measure temperatures in his kilns. His method and temperature scale were then widely adopted in science and technical applications. They were abandoned after the invention of accurate types of pyrometer, such as the pyrometer of John Frederic Daniell in 1830.

Method

A 0.5-inch-diameter cylinder made from pipe clay was dried at the temperature of boiling water. This would prepare it for heating in the oven in which the temperature was to be measured. During the annealing, sintering (merging) of fine particles resulted in contraction of clay. After cooling, the temperature was evaluated from the diameter difference before and after heating assuming that the contraction is linear with temperature.

To facilitate the temperature calculation, Wedgwood built a device which would directly read the temperature. Two metal bars with scales on them were fixed one above another on a metal plate and inclined at a small angle. The spacing between the bars was 0.5 inches at one end and 0.3 inches at the lower end. The scale was divided into 240 equidistant parts. The unheated piece of clay would fit the 0.5-inch gap giving the zero temperature reading. After annealing, the clay cylinder would shrink and fit somewhere in between the left and right ends of the bars, and the temperature could be read from the scales on the bars.

Scale
The origin on the Wedgwood scale (0 °W) was set at the onset temperature of red heat, . Wedgwood tried to compare his scale with other scales by measuring the expansion of silver as a function of temperature. He also determined the melting points of three metals, namely copper (27 °W or ), silver (28 °W or ) and gold (32 °W or ). All these values are at least  too high.

Corrections
However, even after this revision the Wedgwood measurements overestimated the melting points of elements.

Notes and references

Obsolete units of measurement
Scales of temperature
Science and technology in England